The Ommegang of Brussels is a traditional Ommegang, a type of medieval pageant, celebrated annually in Brussels, Belgium.  

Originally, the Ommegang was the largest lustral procession of Brussels, taking place once a year, on the Sunday before Pentecost. Since 1930, it has taken the form of a historical reenactment of the Joyous Entry of Emperor Charles V and his son, Philip II, in Brussels in 1549. As such, it joins the tradition of the great processions of notable riders and giants that are found everywhere in Belgium and northern France.

Nowadays, the event takes place twice a year, at the turn of June and July. It is organised by Ommegang Oppidi Bruxellensis, an association close to the City of Brussels. Its starting point is in the Sablon/Zavel district in Brussels' historic centre and it ends with a large spectacle at the Grand-Place/Grote Markt (Brussels' main square). Since 2019, it is recognised as a Masterpiece of the Oral and Intangible Heritage of Humanity by UNESCO.

Etymology
The Dutch term Ommegang (originally spelled Ommeganck) means "moving around" or "walking around" (e.g. the church, village or city) and is an old historical evocation of Brussels' largest lustral procession, which took place once a year, on the Sunday before Pentecost. The term is similarly used as a generic name for various medieval pageants celebrated in the Low Countries (i.e. areas that are now within Belgium, the Netherlands, and Northern France).

The Ommegang in Brussels was originally an annual Christian procession held in honour of Our Lady of Victory, the city's powerful protector, whose statue is currently in the Church of Our Blessed Lady of the Sablon. This Marian procession gradually acquired a more secular character, and became a social event in which all the city's constituents participate.

History

Origins (–1785)
According to legend, the origin of the Ommegang of Brussels goes back to a local devout woman named Beatrix (Béatrice or Beatrijs) Soetkens. She had a vision in which the Virgin Mary instructed her to steal the miraculous statue of Onze-Lieve-Vrouw op 't Stocxken ("Our Lady on the little stick") from the Cathedral of Our Lady in Antwerp, bring it to Brussels, and place it in the chapel of the Crossbowmen's Guild in the Sablon/Zavel district. The woman stole the statue, and through a series of miraculous events, was able to transport it to Brussels by boat in 1348. It was then solemnly placed in the chapel and venerated as the patron of the Guild. The Guild also promised to hold an annual procession, called an Ommegang, in which the statue was carried through Brussels.

Through the following decades, what was originally a religious procession took on gradually a more worldly outlook. The Ommegang of 1549 corresponds to a golden age of the procession. From the mid-16th century, the Ommegang not only celebrated the miraculous legend, but from 1549, became intertwined with the Joyous Entry of Holy Roman Emperor, Charles V, and his son, Philip II, then-crown prince of the Seventeen Provinces of the Netherlands. On that occasion, Brussels' elites wished to honour the Emperor and his son by organising spectacular equestrian parades in the Sablon and on the Grand-Place/Grote Markt. The Ommegang thus developed into an important religious and civil event in the city's annual calendar.

During the second half of the 16th century, the Ommegang was dependent on political and religious upheavals in the Spanish Low Countries. The event was described at that time in the diary of a bourgeois of Brussels, Jan de Potter, who, over the years, mentions that it was sad, ugly or worse, that it did not take place. Between 1580 and 1585, when the city was in the hands of Calvinists, the procession was simply suppressed. 

In the 17th century, the Ommegang regained its lustre, under the reigns of the Archdukes Albert VII and Isabella, sovereigns of the Spanish Netherlands, as depicted in a series of paintings by the court painters Denis van Alsloot and Antoon Sallaert, representing the celebrations of 1615. In the 18th century, the decline of the demonstration began. The last (very small) annual Ommegang took place in 1785, followed by only two sporadic performances in the 19th century.

Revival (1930–present)
For about a century, Brussels did not celebrate any Ommegang. In 1930, on the occasion of the centenary of the Belgian Revolution, some history enthusiasts supported efforts to commemorate once again the event, in the form of a historical procession. The organisers chose not to revive the ancestral "circumambulation", but to make it a spectacle reproducing the sumptuous Ommegang offered, in 1549, by the city of Brussels to Charles V and his son Philip II. Given the success of this performance, it was decided to repeat it in subsequent years. This was the origin of the current Ommegang.

The current event brings together about 1,400 extras, including several dozen horse riders, crossbowmen, archers, fencers, and arquebusiers, to name a few, dressed in period costumes. There are also stilt walkers and traditional processional giants such as the archangel Saint Michael, Saint Gudula, and the Bayard horse. The magistrates and members of the Seven Noble Houses of Brussels, dressed in the famous Brussels red scarlet stained in the blood of a bull, preceded by the magistrate of the Virgin Mary's statue, also still participate in this sacred procession.

Since 2011, a personality from the world of the arts is entrusted, each year, with the role of herald, and comments on the show at the Grand-Place. Jean-Pierre Castaldi, Stéphane Bern, Jacques Weber, Francis Huster, Éric-Emmanuel Schmitt, and Patrick Poivre d'Arvor, for example, have successively lent themselves to the exercise.

Although it has become a historical show, the Ommegang nevertheless preserves many traditional and authentic elements, such as the presence of the Brussels Lineages, the Oaths of Crossbowmen, as well as the Virgin of Victories, and remains a major yearly event in the minds of the people of Brussels.

Since 2019, the Ommegang has been recognised as a Masterpiece of the Oral and Intangible Heritage of Humanity by UNESCO. The event was cancelled in 2020 and 2021 due to the COVID-19 pandemic in Belgium.

See also

 History of Brussels
 Culture of Belgium
 Seven Noble Houses of Brussels
 Association Royale des Descendants des Lignages de Bruxelles

References

Notes

Bibliography

Further reading
 Leo van Puyvelde, L'Ommegang de 1615 à Bruxelles, Brussels, Éditions du Marais, 1960
 Jean Jacquot, Fêtes et cérémonies au temps de Charles Quint., Fédération internationale des sociétés et instituts pour l'étude de la Renaissance, 1975
 Arthur Haulot, Cette nuit-là, l'Ommegang de Bruxelles, Brussels, Ed. Trois Arches, 1980
 Daniel Frankignioul (dir.), Brigitte Twyffels, Michel Staes, Claude Flagel, Alfred Willis, Pleins Feux sur l'Ommegang, La Reconstitution du Cortège en 1930 par Albert Marinus., Brussels, Fondation Albert Marinus, 1997
 Rosine De Dijn et Siegfried Himmer, La Grand-Place de Bruxelles, fastueux décor de l'Ommegang, Eupen, Grenz-Echo Editions, 1997
 Isabelle Lecomte-Depoorter, Ommegang, with illustrations of René Follet, Éditions Glénat, 1999
 Olivier de Trazegnies, Louis-Philippe Breydel, L'Ommegang, (trilingual), Brussels, Renaissance du Livre, 2007

External links

 Ommegang Oppidi Bruxellensis
 Brussels Ommegang Infos

Annual events in Brussels
Parades in Belgium
Culture in Brussels
History of Brussels
Spring (season) events in Belgium
Recurring events with year of establishment missing